John Sheets may refer to:
 John Richard Sheets, American Roman Catholic bishop
 John M. Sheets, politician from the U.S. state of Ohio